Noshaq (also called Noshak or Nowshak; is the second highest peak in the Hindu Kush Range after Tirich Mir at . It lies on the border between Afghanistan and Pakistan. The north and west sides of the mountain are in Afghanistan whereas the south and eastern sides are in Pakistan. Noshaq is Afghanistan's highest mountain and is located in the northeastern corner of the country along the border with Pakistan. It is the westernmost  peak in the world. Easiest access to Noshaq is from Wakhan Afghanistan.

Climbing history 
Noshaq main was first climbed by a Japanese expedition in 1960 led by Professor Sakato.  Other members of the expedition were Goro Iwatsubo and Toshiaki Sakai.  The climb followed the normal Afghanistan approach, the West ridge from the Qadzi Deh Glacier.  The normal Afghanistan approach route is by the west ridge.

Noshaq East, Noshaq Central and Noshaq West were first climbed in 1963 by Austrians Dr. Gerald Gruber and Rudolf Pischenger.

The Tiroler Hindukusch-Ski-Expedition of Akademischer Alpenklub Innsbruck (Austria) made the first ski descent from the summit of Noshaq in 1970. The famous meteorologist Karl Gabl was member of the team.

The first winter ascent was 13 February 1973 by Tadeusz Piotrowski and Andrzej Zawada, members of a Polish expedition, via the north face. It was the world's first winter climb of any 7000 m peak. Until now it is the only winter ascent to this summit.

Between the Soviet invasion of Afghanistan in 1979 and the fall of the Taliban in 2001, the mountain was very difficult to access because of political turmoil in the region. In 2011, National Geographic noted that the trail to the summit was again accessible to climbers, with hopes of opening the area up for tourism.19.

See also 
 Durand Line
 Extreme points of Afghanistan
 List of elevation extremes by country

References

 http://chitralexplorer.blogspot.com/2011/06/chitral-hidden-paradise-on-earth.html?m=1

External links

 Noshaq on Summitpost

Highest points of countries
International mountains of Asia
Landforms of Badakhshan Province
Mountains of Afghanistan
Mountains of Pakistan
Mountains of the Hindu Kush
Seven-thousanders of the Hindu Kush